Georgios Katidis (born 12 February 1993) is a Greek professional footballer who plays as an attacking midfielder.

Club career

Aris
Katidis rose through the youth ranks at Aris and managed to make his debut for the team at 16 years old.

AEK Athens
On 27 August 2012, Katidis signed a four-year contract with AEK Athens which would keep him at the club until 2016. AEK Athens and his former club Aris agreed on a €100,000 transfer fee.

Katidis created an international controversy on 16 March 2013, when he gave a Nazi salute after scoring the winning goal against Veria. His action drew condemnation from politicians, fans and the media. He later told the public he was unaware of the gesture's connotations, stating that he just wanted to dedicate the goal to a colleague in the stands. AEK coach Ewald Lienen remarked that Katidis "doesn't have an idea about politics".  As a result of the salute, the Hellenic Football Federation voted unanimously to give Katidis a lifetime ban from all Greek national teams and he was fined €50,000.  He was furthermore suspended by AEK for the rest of the season.

Novara Calcio
Italian Serie B side Novara signed Katidis. Novara's owner Massimo de Salvo said that they would not be 'playing down' the incident. "We don't have the intention to play down his gesture," he said. "It was disrespectful to the millions of people that suffered and paid with their lives for those who believed in false ideals and myths." De Salvo also said Katidis' remorse was a key factor in beginning negotiations with the 20-year-old. "We want to give him another chance, because we believe that making such a mistake is serious, but acknowledging it is worthy." The Italian media have dubbed Katidis the 'Greek Di Canio', referring to the former Lazio striker Paolo di Canio, who caused controversy by giving a Nazi salute whilst celebrating a goal. Eventually Katidis signed a 1+1 year contract with the club.

On 31 July 2014, Novara announced the end of cooperation with the player.

Veria
After being away from Greece for a year, Katidis returned to his home country by signing a two-year contract with Veria. Giorgos made his official debut on 20 September 2014 in an away loss against Olympiacos in Pireaus. He made his second appearance against Ermionida in the Greek Cup. He made his third appearance as a substitute as he replaced Sotiris Balafas against PAS Giannina. On 26 January 2015, Katidis was released by the club as he didn't impress with his performances.

Levadiakos
On 29 January 2015, Katidis penned a -year deal with fellow Superleague Greece side Levadiakos. He made his last appearance with the club in a 1–0 away loss against PAOK.

Panegialios
On 10 January 2016 Katidis signed a year contract with Football League club Panegialios.

FF Jaro
On 30 January 2017, Katidis signed a season contract with the Finnish club FF Jaro.
On 4 February 2017, in his first match with the club, Katidis was involved in FF Jaro goals by giving the two assists in a 2–1 Suomen Cup win against SJK. Two weeks later, he scored a brace in an 8–1 away win against SJK Akatemia for the Suomen Cup. On 4 March 2017, he scored a brace in a 6–1 home win against FC Jazz for the Suomen Cup. On 6 May 2017, he made his debut in the League with the club scoring in a 2–0 away win against EIF.

FK Olympia Prague
On 7 August 2017, Katidis left FF Jaro, signing a two-year contract with FK Olympia Prague of the Czech National Football League. On 12 August 2017, he made his debut with the club in a FNL 2-2 home draw against FK Viktoria Žižkov. On 27 August he netted the only goal in a 1–0 away win against Vlašim.

FK Příbram
On 11 July 2018, Katidis signed a two-year contract with 1. FK Příbram of the Czech First League .

Irodotos
On 18 September 2021, George Katidis returns to professional football after almost three years, as he signed for Super League 2 club Irodotos. The last time to note that the 28-year-old played at a professional level was on November 24, 2018, in the Bohemians Prague vs Pribram match for the Czech championship.

International career
Katidis quickly became under 17, under 19 and then under 21 captain of Greece due to excellent performances while he was still playing for Aris FC. He was the captain of the under-19 team that lost in the final to Spain in the 2012 European Championship in Estonia. Scoring in a game on 16 March 2013, Katidis controversially celebrated the goal by giving the crowd a Nazi salute. Katidis later apologized.  The Hellenic Football Federation imposed a lifetime ban on Katidis, barring him from participating in all Greek national teams.

Honours

International
Greece U19
UEFA European Under-19 Championship runner-up: 2012

Individual
UEFA European Under-19 Championship Team of the Tournament: 2012

References

External links

1993 births
Living people
Footballers from Thessaloniki
Association football midfielders
Greek footballers
Greece youth international footballers
Greece under-21 international footballers
Aris Thessaloniki F.C. players
AEK Athens F.C. players
Novara F.C. players
Veria F.C. players
Levadiakos F.C. players
Panegialios F.C. players
FF Jaro players
Super League Greece players
Serie B players
Greek expatriate footballers
Expatriate footballers in Italy
Expatriate footballers in Finland
Greek expatriate sportspeople in Italy